Yaginumaella is a genus of Asian jumping spiders that was first described by Jerzy Prószyński in 1979.

Species
 it contains thirteen species, found in Asia:
Yaginumaella aishwaryi Sunil Jose, 2013 – India
Yaginumaella dali Shao, Li & Yang, 2014 – China
Yaginumaella flexa Song & Chai, 1992 – China
Yaginumaella hyogoensis Bohdanowicz & Prószyński, 1987 – Japan
Yaginumaella lobata Peng, Tso & Li, 2002 – Taiwan
Yaginumaella longnanensis Yang, Tang & Kim, 1997 – China
Yaginumaella lushuiensis Liu, Yang & Peng, 2016 – China
Yaginumaella medvedevi Prószyński, 1979 – Russia, China, Korea
Yaginumaella orthomargina Shao, Li & Yang, 2014 – China
Yaginumaella striatipes (Grube, 1861) – Russia, Japan
Yaginumaella ususudi (Yaginuma, 1972) (type) – Japan
Yaginumaella variformis Song & Chai, 1992 – China
Yaginumaella wenxianensis (Tang & Yang, 1995) – China

References

Salticidae genera
Salticidae
Spiders of Asia
Spiders of Russia